The 1964 LPGA Championship was the tenth LPGA Championship, held October 1–4 at Stardust Country Club in Las Vegas, Nevada.

Mary Mills shot a final round 69 (−2) to win the first of her two LPGA Championships, two strokes ahead runner-up Mickey Wright, the defending champion and 54-hole leader. The total of 278  set a record for the championship which stood until 1978; it was the second of three career majors for Mills.

It was the fourth of six consecutive LPGA Championships at Stardust, which opened three years earlier. After several ownership and name changes, it became Las Vegas National Golf Club in 1998.

Past champions in the field

Source:

Final leaderboard
Sunday, October 4, 1964

Source:

References

External links
Golf Stats  leaderboard
Las Vegas National Golf Club 

Women's PGA Championship
Golf in Las Vegas
LPGA Championship
LPGA Championship
LPGA Championship
LPGA Championship
Women's sports in Nevada